Braggadocio Township is an inactive township in Pemiscot County, in the U.S. state of Missouri.

Braggadocio Township takes its name from the community of Braggadocio, Missouri.

Population
, Braggadocio township has a population of 592 people.

References

Townships in Missouri
Townships in Pemiscot County, Missouri